Watch Out! is the second studio album from Canadian post-hardcore band Alexisonfire, released on June 8, 2004. The album debuted at number 6 on the Canadian Albums Chart, selling 6,580 copies in its first week of release, and was certified Platinum (indicating sales of over 100,000 copies) by the Canadian Recording Industry Association (CRIA) in 2007.

Background and production
Alexisonfire released their self-titled debut studio album in October 2002. It spawned music videos for "Pulmonary Archery", "Counterparts and Number Them", and "Water Wings (And Other Poolside Fashion Faux Pas)", all of which achieved success on the TV channel MuchMusic and its sister channel MuchLoud. The album would eventually sell 30,000 copies in Canada, and peak at number 127 in that country. Throughout 2003, the band promoted the album with two Canadian tours, and four treks across the United States.

For their next album, the band were told to go with a popular producer, and to record at a big studio. Instead, Watch Out! was produced by the band and Julius Butty; sessions were held at Butty's home studio close to Hamilton, Ontario. Butty also acted as engineer and mixer; Brett Zilahi mastered the album.

Composition
Watch Out! is a post-hardcore album, which saw more of a focus on Green's melodic singing, and less emphasis on Pettit's screaming. According to guitarist Wade MacNeil, the closing track of their debut, "Pulmonary Archery", incorporated the "atmospheric sound" that the band expanded upon with Watch Out!. Pettit expanded on this by the saying the band were listening to a lot of ambient rock acts, such as the Appleseed Cast and Mogwai. "Accidents" was written in the basement of MacNeil's mother's house. "Side Walk When She Walks" uses metal guitar riffs and different tempo changes. "No Transitory" opens mid-screaming. "Sharks and Danger" is a darker track that was reminiscent of "Spike" (2003) by the Network.

Release
In March 2004, the group went on the Equal Vision Records Tour with Bane, Armor for Sleep and Silent Drive. On April 19, 2004, Watch Out! was announced for release in two months' time. Alongside this, the album's track listing was posted online. In April and May 2004, the band went on a tour of Canada with Boys Night Out and Blue Skies at War. On May 27, 2004, "Accidents" was made available for download. In May and June 2004, the band went on tour with Silverstein, Emery, the Higher, and Hawthorne Heights. Watch Out! was released in Canada on June 8, 2004, through Distort Entertainment with distribution from EMI Music Canada. The US release occurred three weeks later, through Equal Vision Records. The following month, the band appeared at Hellfest, and a music video for "Accidents" was released to video outlets. In September and October 2004, they went on a Canadian tour, dubbed the Bored with the U.S.A Tour, with Moneen, Hopesfall and Closet Monster.

Following this, the band supported Hot Water Music on their headlining North American tour for two months, and appeared at The Fest. They played two shows in Australia, before embarking on a tour of the United Kingdom with the Bled and ending the year with a few Canadian gigs. Between January and April 2005, Alexisonfire toured the US West Coast with Rise Against, the US East Coast with Emanuel, the Black Maria and Codeseven, and a tour of Canada with Rise Against. Alexisonfire and Rise Against then toured across Europe in April and May 2005. The band toured Canada in September 2005 with the Used and Underoath, which was followed with a headlining tour of Europe the next month. They closed out the year with a US tour in November 2005 with A Wilhelm Scream, the Receiving End of Sirens, Idiot Pilot, and 3.

Reception

Watch Out! was met with generally favourable reviews from music critics. AllMusic reviewer Johnny Loftus wrote that the band "discovered a new yen for moody exploration, and fill the middle of Watch Out! with battered water wings that float on waves of emotion and reverb", though the album "really only refines what Alexisonfire already had the chops and lyrical potential for." Keith Carman of Chart Attack opened his review by stating that the "worst part" about the album was that it was "a massive step up" from their debut. He added that it was "[m]ore experimental without alienating their inherent style," with a "stronger fusion of thunderous metal riffs and throat-tearing vocals". IGN's JR called the album "a fine disc, but boy, things have changed." He went on to note the increase on melodic vocals and the decrease in screaming, which was "a major adjustment, but it makes Watch Out! feel considerably more balanced".

Ox-Fanzine writer Christian Meinders said that the band "perfected their style [of screamo], to put it positively, or the edges that could still be heard on the debut were rounded off to put it less positively." Punknews.org staff member Jordan Rogowski wrote that issues with their debut, such as lack of replay ability and poor production, were "remedied this time around." He went on further to add that "[e]very screamed vocal, and every single chord is dripping with passion and urgency, and it's all put together masterfully."  Dylan Young of Now noted that the "very qualities that strengthened this screamo band's debut are intact: the music is anthemic, the screaming fury impossibly difficult to understand, and the lyrics (when ) slightly above par."

The album debuted at number 6 on the Canadian Albums Chart, selling 6,580 copies in its first week of release. By April 2005, it had sold 50,000 copies in Canada, and 27,500 copies in the US. It was certified Platinum in Canada in April 2007.

Track listing
All songs written by Alexisonfire.

Japanese bonus track

Personnel
Personnel per booklet.

Alexisonfire
 George Pettit – vocals
 Wade MacNeil – guitar, vocals
 Chris Steele – bass
 Dallas Green – guitar, vocals
 Jesse Ingelevics – drums

Production and design
 Alexisonfire – producer
 Julius Butty – producer, engineer, mixer
 Brett Zilahi – mastering
 Justin Winstanley – art concept, illustrations
 Garnet Armstrong – design

Certifications

References
Citations

Sources

 

Alexisonfire albums
2004 albums
Distort Entertainment albums
pl:Watch out!
fi:Watch Out!